Lobosceliana is a genus of grasshoppers in the family Pamphagidae. There are about nine described species in Lobosceliana, found in southern Africa.

Species
These nine species belong to the genus Lobosceliana:
 Lobosceliana brachyptera Hemp, 2013
 Lobosceliana brevicornis (Bolívar, 1915)
 Lobosceliana cinerascens (Stål, 1873)
 Lobosceliana femoralis (Walker, 1870)
 Lobosceliana gilgilensis (Bolívar, 1915)
 Lobosceliana haploscelis (Schaum, 1853)
 Lobosceliana loboscelis (Schaum, 1853)
 Lobosceliana rugosipes (Kirby, 1902)
 Lobosceliana spectrum (Saussure, 1887)

References

Pamphagidae
Orthoptera genera